is a 2017 Japanese science fiction comedy film and an adaptation of the manga series by Shūichi Asō, directed by Yuichi Fukuda. Starring Kento Yamazaki, Ryo Yoshizawa and Kanna Hashimoto at Columbia Pictures (Sony Pictures Entertainment Japan) and Asmik Ace, the film was released on October 21, 2017. A visual for this film was unveiled on Friday, May 20, 2017, revealing Kusuo's parents.

Plot

Kusuo Saiki (Kento Yamazaki) is a 16-year-old high school student. He was born with many powers, including telepathy and telekinesis. This may sound cool, but, according to Kusuo's experience, super powers are not as good as we imagine. He tries to live a normal life, despite having a power that upsets him. Kusuo Saiki now tries to keep a distance from others to hide his psychic abilities, but his classmates with distinct individuality gather under Kusuo.

Cast
 Kento Yamazaki as Kusuo Saiki
 Hirofumi Arai as Riki Nendō
 Ryo Yoshizawa as Shun Kaidō
 Hideyuki Kasahara as Kineshi Hairo
 Kanna Hashimoto as Kokomi Teruhashi
 Kento Kaku as Aren Kuboyasu
 Tsuyoshi Muro as Uryoku Chōno
 Jiro Sato as Pinsuke Kanda
 Seiichi Tanabe as Kuniharu Saiki
 Yuki Uchida as Kurumi Saiki

Reception
This film grossed  at the Japanese box office.

Rachel Cheung of South China Morning Post found the film to be overacted: "It may be funny for the first time, and maybe the second, that the sweet 19-year-old actress Hashimoto imitates the exaggerated facial expressions of her anime character; but when it happens for the 10th time, it becomes quite boring, if not irritating."

See also
The Disastrous Life of Saiki K.

References

External links
  
 

2017 films
2010s science fiction comedy films
Alien invasions in films
Columbia Pictures films
Films about NASA
Films about technology
Films set in Japan
Films set in outer space
Films about psychic powers
Films set in Tokyo
Fiction about government
2010s Japanese-language films
Japanese fantasy comedy films
Japanese science fiction comedy films
Live-action films based on manga
Mythology in popular culture
Supernatural anime and manga
2010s fantasy comedy films
2010s Japanese films